The Next-Generation Offshore Patrol Vessel (OPV) program consists of a planned 12 OPV-type patrol vessels to be operated by the Japan Maritime Self-Defense Force (JMSDF).

Background

On 30 June 2022, the Japan Ministry of Defense (MOD) announced the construction of 12 offshore patrol vessels (OPV) for the Japanese Maritime Self-Defense Force (JMSDF) at a cost of ¥ 9 billion (US$66 million) per ship. Japan Marine United Corporation (JMU) is the prime contractor for this program with Mitsubishi Heavy Industries (MHI) chosen to be the subcontractor.  Both JMU and MHI as well as Mitsui Engineering & Shipbuilding had submitted preliminary designs for the proposed next-generation OPVs.

According to a video release in July 2021 by the MOD's Acquisition, Technology & Logistics Agency (ATLA), the purpose of this OPV program is to provide enhanced maritime security, particularly around the southwestern Ryukyu Islands, including the disputed Senkaku/Diaoyu Islands in the East China Sea, by boosting JMSDF patrol activities in the region (See map).  

Four ships were initially scheduled to be introduced by FY2024, and 12 by FY2029. The first four OPVs are part of the 2023 Defense budget of the Japanese MOD.

Design  
These vessels are highly automated and configurable to meet a wide range of missions to provide “enhanced steady-state intelligence, surveillance, and reconnaissance (ISR) in the waters around Japan.” Under the contract, JMU is charged with delivering the 12 vessels to the JMSDF from fiscal year 2023, which starts on April 1, 2023. The OPV will used the UNIted COmbined Radio aNtenna (UNICORN) NORA-50 integration mast, which has a bar-shaped dome that houses the antennas for tactical data link, Tactical Air Navigation System (TACAN), and communications. According to ATLA, UNICORN has a shape designed to reduce the radar cross section (RCS), which makes it stealthy. It is currently being installed on the s entering service or under construction. In addition, there is a possibility that they will be considered for integration into the OPV.

Equipment

Ship & power systems
The conception artwork also depicts a bow thruster system. Each OPV will be armed with a foredeck-mounted 30-mm naval gun for self-defense. A crane is fitted to the aft section of the vessel near the multi-purpose hangar and multipurpose rear deck for helicopters or unmanned aerial vehicle (UAV) operations. A launch and recovery system (LARS) is also be integrated to the stern.

Mission modules
The OPVs have ISO containerization capabilities for mission modules that can be installed on board.  Minesweeping-related equipment, such as the Autonomous Surface Vehicle (ASV) and Expendable Mine Disposal (EMD), were part of the preliminary design work by Mitsui Engineering & Shipbuilding and displayed at the 2019 MAST Asia defense trade-show, but no decision was made on the final mine counter-measures (MCM) suite.

Operational concept
According to a video release in July 2021 by the MOD's Acquisition, Technology & Logistics Agency (ATLA), the purpose of this OPV program is to provide enhanced maritime security, particularly around the southwestern Ryukyu Islands, including the disputed Senkaku/Diaoyu Islands in the East China Sea, by boosting JMSDF patrol activities in the region.  The OPV will take over the patrol missions of the s and s currently operated by JMSDF, including monitoring of other countries’ military vessels in the Sea of Japan, East China Sea, and Pacific Ocean. While the OPV’s primary mission is patrol, and its armament is very limited, it will be very well equipped for intelligence, surveillance, and reconnaissance (ISR).

Ships in the class

Naming conventions
The proposed JMSDF next-generation offshore patrol vessels (OPVs) have not been officially named. Ships of the JMSDF are known as Japan Ships (Ji'ei-Kan) and are classified according to the warship type. Patrol boats (PG) are named for birds, grass or one that added a number to the type.  It is not known if these proposed next-generation offshore patrol vessels will have a new type designation (i.e., OPV) or patrol boats (PG)..

See also
 Future Multi Purpose Trimaran concept

References

Bibliography

External links
Japan Marine United To Build JMSDF’s Next Generation Offshore Patrol Vessels (OPV) - Update Defense - July 1, 2022
Japan Maritime United (JMU) to Build The Next Generations of Japanese Offshore Patrol Vessels (OPV) - TheAsianChannel - July 2, 2022
Japan Marine United to Build JMSDF’s Next Generation OPV - Gono Vsion Plus - July 14, 2022
Japan Build The Next-Generation Offshore Patrol Vessels for JMSDF - Public Defense - July 16, 2022

Proposed ships
Patrol vessels of the Japan Maritime Self-Defense Force
Ships built in Japan